Wild Beasts also known as The Wild Beasts is a 1984 English-language Italian horror film written and directed by Franco E. Prosperi and starring Lorraine De Selle.

Plot
The animals of the Frankfurt zoo become violent and dangerous when they drink water contaminated with Phencyclidine.

Cast
 Lorraine De Selle as Laura Schwarz
 Antonio Di Leo as Rupert Berner
 Ugo Bologna as Inspector Nat Braun
 Louisa Lloyd as Suzy Schwarz

Release

Reception
Mike Massie from "Gone With The Twins" gave the film 4 out of 10 stars, stating: "The acting is mediocre, the dialogue is unconvincing, the characters are flimsy, and the story is shoddily constructed, but the tone is mostly serious, which helps counter the abundance of deficiencies in filmmaking techniques (and all of the unintentional hilarity)". James Jay Edwards writing for the website "Film Fracture" called the movie "over-the-top exploitation", saying: "As a movie, it’s a silly and amateurish affair, lit just a bit too darkly to completely see everything and full of actors who don’t seem to know quite how to deliver the corny dialogue". Kevin Matthews from "FlickFeast", wrote: "Wild Beasts is not hailed as a classic, and most likely it never will be, but it’s actually a lot of fun while it’s on and never dull, unlike some other entries in this particular sub-genre".

Wild Beast was nominated for the "Grand Prize" at the 1984 Avoriaz Fantastic Film Festival.

References

External links
 
 

1984 horror films
1984 films
English-language Italian films
Films set in Frankfurt
1980s English-language films